Yehoshua Gal (born 5 July 1951) is a former Israeli footballer.

Honours
Championships
1970–71
Israeli Supercup
1971

References

External links
 

1951 births
Living people
Israeli footballers
Israel international footballers
Olympic footballers of Israel
Footballers at the 1976 Summer Olympics
Maccabi Netanya F.C. players
Maccabi Haifa F.C. players
Footballers from Netanya
People from Netanya
Association football forwards